This list of Harper's Bazaar Russia cover models is a catalog of cover models/celebrities who have appeared on the cover of Harper's Bazaar Russia, the Russian edition of Harper's Bazaar magazine, starting with first issue in March 1996.

1996

1997

1998

1999

2000

2001

2002

2003

2004

2005

2006

2007

2008

2009

2010

2011

2012

2013

2014

2015

2016

2017

2018

2019

References

External links
 Harper's Bazaar Russia on Models.com
 https://www.flickr.com/photos/61104921@N08/sets/72157627085518780

Russia